Herod is an unincorporated community in Pope County, Illinois, United States. Herod is located on Illinois Route 34 at the edge of the Shawnee National Forest. Herod has a post office with ZIP code 62947.

A cultural heritage group and nonprofit organization, the Vinyard Indian Settlement, is based in Herod.

References

Unincorporated communities in Pope County, Illinois
Unincorporated communities in Illinois